Vivian Ellen (née Veach) Hickey (March 25, 1916 – April 28, 2016) was an American educator and politician.

Born in Clayton, Illinois, Hickey received her bachelor's degree from Rockford University, in 1937 and her master's degree from the University of North Carolina, in 1938. Hickey also studied at Bradley Polytechnic Institute and University of Wisconsin. She taught at Keith Country Day School, Winnebago High School, and Rockford University. She lived in Rockford, Illinois. Hickey was elected to the Rock Valley College Board and was involved with the Democratic Party. In 1974, Hickey was appointed to the Illinois Senate after Senator Betty Ann Keegan died while in office. Hickey served until 1979. In 2011, Hickey moved to Mill Valley, California to be closer to her family. She died at the Redwoods Retirement Community in Mill Valley, California.

Notes

External links

1916 births
2016 deaths
People from Adams County, Illinois
Politicians from Rockford, Illinois
People from Mill Valley, California
Bradley University alumni
University of North Carolina alumni
University of Wisconsin–Madison alumni
Rockford University alumni
Rockford University faculty
Women state legislators in Illinois
Democratic Party Illinois state senators
American centenarians
Women centenarians
American women academics
21st-century American women